Diarmuid Rossa Phelan is a farmer, senior counsel, professor at the School of Law, Trinity College Dublin and fellow of Trinity College Dublin. He is also a member of the Bar of England and Wales, the Bar of Northern Ireland and the New York State Bar Association. He is a citizen of the United States.

Personal life
On 3 August 2008 he was seriously injured when the car he was in was hit by a car driven by Catherine O'Meara. After the accident he was cut from the vehicle and taken to Nenagh Hospital. He suffered from a spinal injury and over a decade later was still being treated. A court case to determine damages was settled between him and O'Meara.

He owns mixed organic livestock farms in County Wexford and near Tallaght, County Dublin.  The farms also run training programs for veterinary students

Career
He was made Junior Counsel in 1994 and Senior Counsel in 2008.
He was a junior counsel to the Moriarty Tribunal on the issuing of the second GSM licence.

He represented the companies Phone Paid services Association Ltd, Modeva Interactive and Zamano Plc before the High Court in 2012.

Thirty-third Amendment of the Constitution of Ireland

During the debate over the amendment, he suggested that giving the Supreme Court absolute discretion to select which cases to hear was dangerous and would need to be monitored for mission creep.

Death of Keith Conlon
Keith Conlon was shot at Phelan's farm near Tallaght on 22 February 2022 and died in Tallaght University Hospital two days later. Phelan was subsequently charged with murder and initially denied bail. He was later granted bail on April 8 after an appeal.

References

External links
Home Page

Academics of Trinity College Dublin
Irish scholars and academics
Irish solicitors
Fellows of Trinity College Dublin
Year of birth missing (living people)
Living people